Saint-Michel-de-Vax is a rural commune and hamlet in the Tarn department in southern France.

The hamlet is located on a largely wooded Causse just east of the road between the small towns of Saint-Antonin-Noble-Val and Cordes. The hamlet has no local amenities and consists of about 30 houses, a church and a partially ruined chateau.

See also
Communes of the Tarn department

References

Communes of Tarn (department)